Jaclyn Cole Miskanic (born May 5, 1996), known professionally as Jax, is an American singer-songwriter from East Brunswick, New Jersey. She finished third on the fourteenth season of American Idol, an American singing competition series.

Her first entry on the Billboard Hot 100 chart was for her song "Victoria's Secret".

Early life 
Jax was raised in Atlantic Beach, New York, and moved with her family in 2005 to East Brunswick, New Jersey. She began singing at age 5. Her father, John, is a firefighter, who was injured on duty during the September 11 attacks, and her mother, Jill, is a New York City school teacher. After attending the East Brunswick Public Schools, Jax was homeschooled starting in eighth grade, in order to allow her sufficient time for voice lessons, performances and recording.

In mid-2014, she studied at New York University in London, where she won the John Lennon Scholarship in songwriting via the BMI Foundation.

Career

American Idol

Jax auditioned for the fourteenth season of American Idol, with the song "I Want To Hold Your Hand" by The Beatles. She sang "Toxic" by Britney Spears for her first solo audition during Hollywood Week. Jax sang The Beatles' "Let It Be" for her final solo performance. She was the only contestant out of 80 to be declared safe immediately after the performance. In April 2015, Jax became New Jersey's most successful American Idol contestant. In March 2015, she performed at the Filmore in Detroit, Michigan wearing #thedress. She performed Janis Joplin's "Piece of My Heart" with Steven Tyler during the show's season finale. Jax finished third in the competition, and her first single, "Forcefield", was released following the finale. In July 2015, Jax and the other top five American Idol contestants began the American Idols LIVE! Tour 2015. The tour began in Clearwater, Florida and ended on August 28, 2015 in Riverside, California. The top 3 all released a single each, the top 4 all released an extended play each, American Idol Season 14: Best of Jax - EP, and the season 14 top 9, 8, 7, 6, and 5 all released a contribution each.

Performances

Post-Idol
Jax's first post-Idol recording, "La La Land", was released on January 6, 2016. Her first music video was released later that day, for "La La Land". The song is lyrically about her experience on American Idol.

In August 2016, Jax revealed that she was battling thyroid cancer, but has been declared cancer-free since then.

In 2017 she released the EP Funny which charted at number 17 on the Billboard Heatseekers Albums.

In 2018, Jax was invited to perform at the White House's Independence Day celebration. This caused some controversy, due to the feelings surrounding Trump's presidency at the time. Jax then appeared on Fox and Friends on the Fox News Channel to defend her decision to perform at the White House, calling the criticism "vulgarity" and "bullying" rather than political commentary. She continued to explain "I come from a really patriotic family" and that she was intent on honoring the troops during this celebration without listening to the "pettiness" coming from public forums. 

In January 2021, she signed a record deal with Atlantic Records. 
In October 2021, her song "Like My Father" debuted at number 38 on the Billboard Adult Pop Airplay, her first song to chart on Billboard charts.

In November 2021, Jax posted a dramatic TikTok reading of her ex-boyfriend's apology text messages after he cheated on her. The reading was accompanied by sad violin music by Lindsey Stirling. Jax and Stirling say they received hundreds of similar text messages from fans, and plan to turn them into a TikTok series.

In 2022 she released "Victoria's Secret."

Discography

Singles

References

External links
 

1996 births
Living people
21st-century American singers
Singers from New Jersey
American Idol participants
American TikTokers
People from East Brunswick, New Jersey
People from Atlantic Beach, New York
21st-century American women singers